Lostcreek Township is one of the twelve townships of Miami County, Ohio, United States.  The 2000 census found 1,633 people in the township, 1,311 of whom lived in the unincorporated portions of the township.

Geography
Located in the eastern part of the county, it borders the following townships:
Brown Township - north
Jackson Township, Champaign County - east
Pike Township, Clark County - southeast corner
Elizabeth Township - south
Staunton Township - west
Springcreek Township - northwest corner

The village of Casstown is located in southwestern Lostcreek Township.

Name and history
Lostcreek Township was established in 1818, and named after Lost Creek, a tributary of the Great Miami River. It is the only Lostcreek Township statewide.

Government
The township is governed by a three-member board of trustees, who are elected in November of odd-numbered years to a four-year term beginning on the following January 1. Two are elected in the year after the presidential election and one is elected in the year before it. There is also an elected township fiscal officer, who serves a four-year term beginning on April 1 of the year after the election, which is held in November of the year before the presidential election. Vacancies in the fiscal officership or on the board of trustees are filled by the remaining trustees.

Public Meetings

Meetings are typically held on the first and third Thursday of every month.  Some meetings are rescheduled or cancelled due to holidays or special events.  They are held at 7PM local time at the Casstown, Ohio post office located at 101B Center St, Casstown, OH 45312.

References

External links
County website

Townships in Miami County, Ohio
Townships in Ohio